Candido P. Pancrudo Jr. (born December 20, 1955) is a Filipino politician. A member of the Lakas-CMD, he was a Member of the House of Representatives of the Philippines, representing the First District of Bukidnon from 2007 to 2010.
 
Pancrudo won his seat by defeating the sister of his predecessor, Nereus Acosta, and former COMELEC Commissioner Virgilio Garcillano. He faced an election protest filed by Malou Acosta which is now with the Supreme Court. Per the decision of the Huouse of Representatives Electoral Tribunal his initial lead of 121 votes is now reduced to less than 15 votes.

Notes

References

 

1955 births
Living people
Lakas–CMD (1991) politicians
Members of the House of Representatives of the Philippines from Bukidnon
Independent politicians in the Philippines
Lakas–CMD politicians
People from Bukidnon